Nabis edax is a species of damsel bug in the family Nabidae. It is found in North America.

References

Further reading

 

Nabidae
Articles created by Qbugbot
Insects described in 1929